The Colombia national under-23 football team represents Colombia at the Summer Olympic Games and in international under-23 football competitions and is overseen by the Colombian Football Federation.

The team played its first match in 1950. From that year to 1992 the team played as a Colombia national amateur football team. Since 1992, the team played as Colombia national under-23 football team until 2004, when the qualification for the Olympic Games was changed to South American Youth Football Championship for under-20 teams (before this, the qualification tournament was CONMEBOL Men Pre-Olympic Tournament). The team was inactive since 2004, however with the qualification to the 2016 Summer Olympics qualification play-off the team was resurrected.

Competitive record
*Draws include knockout matches decided on penalty kicks.
**Gold background colour indicates that the tournament was won.
***Red border colour indicates tournament was held on home soil.

 Champions   Runners-up   Third Place   Fourth Place

Olympic Games

CONMEBOL Men Pre-Olympic Tournament

Pan American Games

Schedule and results

2020

Players

Current squad
The following 23 players were called up for the 2020 CONMEBOL Pre-Olympic Tournament

Caps and goals updated as 17 November 2019.

Notes

Recent call-ups
The following players have been recently called up in the last 12 months.

Overage players in Olympic Games

Coaching staff

Honours 

 Pan American Games:
 Silver Medalists (1): 1971
 Bronze Medalists (1): 1995
 CONMEBOL Pre-Olympic Tournament:
 Runners-up (4): 1968, 1971, 1980, 1992
 Fourth place (4): 1964, 1976, 1987, 2020
 Central American and Caribbean Games
  Gold Medalists (3): 1946, 2006, 2018
  Silver Medalists (1): 2014
  Bronze Medalists (3): 1938, 1954, 1970
 South American Games:
  Gold Medalists (3): 1994, 2010, 2014
  Silver Medalists (1): 1986
  Bronze Medalists (2): 1990, 2018
 Bolivarian Games
  Gold Medalists (5): 1951, 1997, 2005, 2013, 2017
  Silver Medalists (6):  1961, 1973, 1981, 1985, 1993, 2001

Friendlies

 Torneo de las Americas:
 Winners: 1994

See also
 Colombia national football team
 Colombia national futsal team
 Colombia national under-20 football team
 Colombia national under-17 football team
 Colombia national under-15 football team

Notes

References

olympic
South American national under-23 association football teams